The Information School (or iSchool) at the University of Washington is an undergraduate and graduate school that offers BS, MLIS, MS, and PhD degrees. Formerly the Graduate School of Library and Information Sciences (GSLIS), the Information School changed its focus and name in the late 1990s.

History
In 1911, it was a library school founded by Harriet Howe, Josephine Meissner, William E. Henry and Charles W. Smith, established in response to a growing need in the Western United States for highly trained, well-prepared librarians. history] Prior to 1911, untrained librarians in the Pacific Northwest were trained through a six-week summer course offered at the University of Washington.

Name changes include: (1911-1916) Department of Library Economy; (1916-1932) Library School; (1932-1935) Department of Library Science in the Graduate School; (1935-1984) School of Librarianship; and (1984-2001) Graduate School of Library and Information Science. Finally, in 2001, the school was renamed the Information School, becoming the newest independent school at the University of Washington.

The Information School introduced several new continuing education certificate programs and degree programs in 2000 in response to changes in how people create, store, find, manipulate and share information. Under the leadership of Professor and Dean Emeritus Michael Eisenberg, the Information School introduced the Bachelor of Science in Informatics, online Master of Library and Information Science, Master of Science in Information Management, and Ph.D. in Information Science.

Directors and deans
 1914-1931 William E. Henry
 1931-1945 Ruth Worden
 1945-1950 Robert L. Gitler
 1950-1955 Gladys Boughton (acting, 1950-1952)
 1955-1956 Dorothy Bevis (acting)
 1956-1972 Irving Lieberman
 1972-1974 Mae Benne (acting)
 1974-1981 Peter Hiatt
 1981-1992 Margaret E. Chisholm (acting, 1981-1983)
 1992-1993 Edmond Mignon (acting)
 1993-1996 Phyllis Van Orden
 1996-1997 Edward Bassett (acting)
 1997-1998 Betty Bengtson (acting)
 1998-2006 Michael Eisenberg
 2006-2017 Harry Bruce
 2017-2018 Carole Palmer (acting)
 2018–present Anind Dey

Curriculum

Bachelor's program
The Information School offers one undergraduate degree: the Bachelor of Science in Informatics. The Informatics program is a competitive two-year program focused on the design of information systems and services, with particular emphasis on the following areas:
 Human-computer interaction
 Information architecture
 Cybersecurity and information assurance
 Data Science

The program touches on privacy issues, ethics, and management, as well as design, search engines, web development, and database design. Students study a broad range of areas in the information field, including: information management and technology, information-related research, interactive system design, human-computer interaction, and information science. The program's curriculum culminates in a design or research capstone project. The Informatics program has the largest enrollment of any program at the iSchool.

Graduates of the program typically go on to jobs such as:
 Information architect
 Web designer
 Content Strategist
 Interface designer
 Network administrator
 IT director/manager
 Database manager
 Software engineer
 Technology solutions consultant
 Project manager
 Web developer
 Systems analyst
 Business analyst
 Program Manager
 Product Planner
 User experience designer
 Usability engineer
 Network manager
 Information security and assurance professional
 Software Developer

Informatics minor
In 2017, the Information School added an Informatics minor. The minor complements a variety of majors on campus by offering students an opportunity to learn about data, design, policy, ethics, and code in order to solve information problems. It may be especially helpful to students in the humanities and social sciences who wish to know more about data, code, design, and policy.

Master's programs
The Information School offers two master's degrees: the Master of Science in Information Management (MSIM) and the Master of Library and Information Science (MLIS).

Master of Science in Information Management (MSIM)
The MSIM program (Master of Information Management) requires two years to earn the degree and takes a multidisciplinary approach to the management of information systems and policy. It draws on computer science, business, information science, philosophy, design, and law to inform its curriculum. The MSIM program is divided into two sub-programs: 1) a day program, a traditional, daytime program for students of all academic and work backgrounds; and 2) an executive program, an evening and weekend program tailored to working professionals.

Graduates work in a variety of professional areas and positions, including, but not limited to:
 Information Architect
 User Experience Designer
 Data Visualization Specialist
 Systems Analyst
 Data Scientist
 Software Design Engineer
 Risk Consultant
 Web Computing Specialist
 Network Administrator
 Database Developer
 Cybersecurity Professional
 Project Manager

Master of Library and Information Science (MLIS)
The MLIS is the iSchool's oldest degree. It is a two-year professional degree that prepares students for careers in library and information professions. Like its sister, the MSIM program, the MLIS program is divided into two sub-programs: 1) a day program for traditional students, and 2) a distance program for geographically disparate students. In 2017 the iSchool's MLIS program was ranked #2 in the nation by U.S. News & World Report.

Additionally, the iSchool offers a third MLIS degree—the Law MLIS program, a one-year degree designed to prepare lawyers to serve as law librarians. The Law Librarianship program was the highest-ranked program in the nation by U.S. News & World Report in 2017.

Ph.D. program
The Ph.D. program is a theoretical, research-based doctorate in the field of Information Science. Research areas include data science, digital humanities, digital youth, health and well-being, human-computer interaction, indigenous knowledge, information and society, learning sciences, library and information sciences, and socio-technical information systems. Ph.D. program alumni have gone on to careers in public sectors (tenure-track faculty, post-doctoral researchers, administrators in higher education) and private sectors (industry researchers, business/industry positions).

Leadership
The Founding Board offers strategic advice to the dean with a focus on building awareness of and attracting resources to the Information School. The Founding Board also leads fundraising initiatives for the Information School.

Faculty
As of October 2017, the Information School's faculty numbered 54 core members, along with numerous adjunct and affiliated faculty members. The school makes recruitment and retention of traditionally underrepresented groups among the priorities of its Faculty Affairs division. Working with the iSchool's Diversity Programs Coordinator, the UW Vice Provost for Faculty Advancement, and others, Faculty Affairs works to address systemic barriers and roadblocks through changes in policy and practice and in dialogue with the faculty and the community.

Student organizations
The Information School offers opportunities for students to participate in professional and student communities. The most prominent iSchool student groups are:
 ASIS&T (American Society for Information Science and Technology)
 GPSS (Graduate and Professional Students Senate)
 
  (a community for distance MLIS students)
  (the iSchool's volunteer and service organization)
 SLA (Special Libraries Association)
 SALA (The University of Washington's Student Chapter of the American Library Association)

Facilities

The school is in Mary Gates Hall, one of several university buildings bordering Drumheller Fountain. Formerly known as the Physics Building, it was renamed in 1995 after receipt of a $10 million gift from the family of Mary Maxwell Gates. In 1999 a $35 million expansion added updated classrooms and computer labs, office spaces, and commons, transforming the 1928 historic building and 1949 addition into a 175,000-square-foot quadrangle with a skylit commons at its center and a new main entry facing Suzzallo Library. The architects of the original building were John Graham & Company and the architects of record for the 1999 expansion were Bassetti Architects.

References

Information School
Information schools
1911 establishments in Washington (state)